Joyce Akai Emanikor is a Kenyan politician who is currently a member of the National Assembly as the county woman representative for Turkana County. She is a member of the Jubilee Party.

She studied at Daystar University and the University of Manchester before working at OXFAM and UNICEF. She was elected to parliament in 2013.

Election results

References

Kenyan politicians
Year of birth missing (living people)
Living people